Renan Bardini Bressan (born 3 November 1988) is a professional footballer who plays as an attacking midfielder for Criciúma. Born in Brazil, he represented the Belarus national team.

Club career

FC Gomel
Born in Tubarão, Santa Catarina, Bressan began his career at hometown club Clube Atlético Tubarão. In April 2007 he moved abroad for the first time, joining Belarusian FC Gomel.

BATE Borisov
On 28 January 2010, Bressan signed with BATE Borisov. He scored 15 goals during his first season with BATE, becoming the top scorer in the Belarusian Premier League for the 2010 season. He was also selected as the best midfielder in the league for the year.

On 2 October 2012, Bressan scored BATE's third goal in their 3–1 shock defeat of Bayern Munich in the second game of the Champions League group stage.

Alania Vladikavkaz
In late November 2012, Russian Premier League club Alania Vladikavkaz acquired the services of Bressan. In October 2013, Bressan unilaterally terminated the contract because of gross violations of financial terms of the agreement by the club.

FC Astana
On 15 January 2014, Bressan signed a two-year contract with FK Aktobe, but less than a month later his contract was mutually terminated on 7 February. Bressan went on to sign a two-year contract with FC Astana on the 10th, but was released from his contract on 12 July after only 7 games for the club.

Rio Ave
On 2 August 2014, Bressan signed a two-year contract with Portuguese Primeira Liga club Rio Ave.

APOEL
On 24 June 2016, Bressan signed a two-year contract with reigning Cypriot champions APOEL FC. He made his competitive debut on 19 July 2016, coming on as a 58th-minute substitute in APOEL's 3–0 home win against The New Saints for the second qualifying round of the UEFA Champions League. He scored his first goal for APOEL on 6 November 2016, netting the fourth goal in his team's 4–1 home victory against Karmiotissa for the Cypriot First Division. On 9 January 2017, his contract with APOEL was mutually terminated.

International career
Bressan also has Belarusian citizenship and is eligible to play in official competitions for the Belarus national team since April 2012. He made his debut for Belarus on 29 February 2012 in a friendly match against Moldova. During the football tournament of the 2012 Summer Olympics he was one of three overage players selected by the Belarusian federation and scored the only goal for Belarus U23 in a 3–1 loss against the country he was born in – Brazil.

Career statistics
Scores and results list Belarus' goal tally first, score column indicates score after each Bressan goal.

Honours 
BATE Borisov
Belarusian Premier League: 2010, 2011, 2012
Belarusian Cup: 2009–10
Belarusian Super Cup: 2010, 2011

Astana
Kazakhstan Premier League: 2014

Individual
Belarusian Premier League top scorer: 2010, 2011
Belarusian Footballer of the Year: 2012

References

External links

1988 births
Living people
Sportspeople from Santa Catarina (state)
Brazilian footballers
Belarusian footballers
Brazilian emigrants to Belarus
Association football midfielders
Olympic footballers of Belarus
Footballers at the 2012 Summer Olympics
Belarus international footballers
Belarusian expatriate footballers
Brazilian expatriate footballers
Expatriate footballers in Russia
Expatriate footballers in Kazakhstan
Expatriate footballers in Portugal
Expatriate footballers in Cyprus
Belarusian Premier League players
Russian Premier League players
Kazakhstan Premier League players
Primeira Liga players
Cypriot First Division players
Clube Atlético Tubarão players
FC Gomel players
FC BATE Borisov players
FC Spartak Vladikavkaz players
FC Aktobe players
FC Astana players
Rio Ave F.C. players
APOEL FC players
G.D. Chaves players
Cuiabá Esporte Clube players
Paraná Clube players
Esporte Clube Juventude players
Clube de Regatas Brasil players
Criciúma Esporte Clube players
Vila Nova Futebol Clube players